The Sadlier Baronetcy, of Temple Dinsey in the County of Hertford, was a title in the Baronetage of England.  It was created on 3 December 1661 for Edwyn Sadlier.  The title became extinct on the death of the second Baronet in 1719.

Sadlier baronets, of Temple Dinsey (1661)
Sir Edwyn Sadlier, 1st Baronet ( – 1672)
Sir Edwin Sadlier, 2nd Baronet (c. 1656 – 1719)

References

Extinct baronetcies in the Baronetage of England
1661 establishments in England